Maybe Smith is the stage name of Colin Skrapek, a Canadian indie pop singer and songwriter based in Saskatoon, Saskatchewan. He releases his material on the independent label Sir, Handsome Records.

In 2007, he embarked on a cross-Canada tour with Carbon Dating Service.

Discography

 The Arriere Garde EP (2002)
 One For None (2003)
 Root Hug (2004)
 Second Best Death (2005)
 Animals & Architects (2007)
 Snowmen & Scientists EP (2007)
 Another Murder in the Morning (2009)

References

External links
 Maybe Smith

Canadian pop singers
Canadian male singers
Canadian singer-songwriters
Living people
Musicians from Saskatoon
Year of birth missing (living people)
Canadian male singer-songwriters